Leonidas Hubbard Jr. (1872–1903) was an American journalist and adventurer.

He was born in Michigan and studied at the University of Michigan (1893–97), choosing journalism as a career. In 1901 he married Mina Adelaine Benson, a woman two years senior and at the time an assistant superintendent of a Staten Island hospital. They met at the hospital when Hubbard was ill with typhoid fever. He became an assistant editor of Outing magazine and in 1903 led an expedition to canoe the system Naskaupi River–Michikamau Lake in Labrador and George River in Quebec. His companions on this journey were his friend, New York lawyer Dillon Wallace and an Indian guide from Missanabie, George Elson.

Ill-fated expedition
From the start (departing North West River on July 15), the expedition was beset with mistakes and problems. Instead of ascending the Naskaupi River, by mistake they followed the shallow Susan Brook. After a hard, long portaging and almost reaching Michikamau Lake, with food supplies running out, on September 15 at Windbound lake, they decided to turn back. On October 18, Wallace and Elson went in a search of cached store of flour, leaving Hubbard behind in a tent. Hubbard died of exhaustion and starvation on either the same or the next day. Wallace got lost in the snowstorm, while Elson, after a week of bushwhacking, building raft to cross swollen rivers (with no ax), reached the nearest occupied cabin. A search party found Wallace alive on October 30, 1903.

After Wallace was nursed back to health (he suffered gangrene in his foot), the two men accompanied Hubbard's body back to New York for burial in May 1904.

In 1905, Mina Hubbard, accompanied by George Elson, and Dillon Wallace led two competing expeditions from North West River to the Hudson's Bay Company post at the mouth of George River. Both were successful, with Mina Hubbard beating Dillon Wallace by over seven weeks.

In 1913, Wallace returned with Judge William Malone and Gilbert Blake to place a memorial plaque where his friend perished. Their canoe overturned on Beaver River and the plaque was lost. Wallace then created a memorial using white paint and a brush made from Gilbert's hair. In July 1977, with the assistance of the Government of Newfoundland and Labrador, Dillon Wallace III, the son of Hubbard's companion, and Rudy Mauro placed a replica of the lost plaque on the inscribed stone at Hubbard's last camp. The inscription reads:

The 1903 and 1905 expeditions were the subject of a 2008 Canadian docudrama The Last Explorer, directed by Elson's great nephew, Cree filmmaker Neil Diamond.

Three plaques at Mount Repose Cemetery in Haverstraw, NY celebrate his achievements. One of them reads:

References

Further reading
 James West Davidson & John Rugge, Great Heart: The History of a Great Labrador Adventure (1988)
 Dillon Wallace, The Lure of the Labrador Wild (1905)
 Philip Schubert, Letters to the Granddaughter, The Story of Dillon Wallace of the Labrador Wild

External links
 Greville Haslam Correspondence Re. Hubbard Memorial Tablet at Dartmouth College Library

Explorers of North America
Explorers of Canada
American male journalists
Journalists from Michigan
1872 births
1903 deaths
Pre-Confederation Newfoundland and Labrador people
University of Michigan alumni